Sir George Hunter (1859 – 20 August 1930) was a New Zealand politician of the Reform Party. Born in Wellington, he took over his father's large landholding in the Hawke's Bay at age 18. He was a breeder of sheep and race horses, with his horse Cynisca winning the Wellington Cup three times in a row. Hunter was prominent in local politics, and represented the  electorate in the House of Representatives for a total of 22 years.

Farming and horse racing
Hunter was born in Wellington in 1859. He was a son of George Hunter, and a grandson of George Hunter, the first Mayor of Wellington. He worked on his father's farm in Te Aro, which is now part of the Wellington central business district. The central part of the land is now covered by Upper Dixon Street, Percival Street, and Macdonald Crescent.

His father had a further  farm in Porangahau in the Hawke's Bay Region, which he took up in circa 1854. As his father lived in Wellington, the Porangahau farm was run by his father's brothers David and William. Hunter junior took over the running of the farm from his uncles in 1877, and owned it in partnership with his brother Paul. Hunter lived at Porangahau for most of his life. The brothers bred Thoroughbreds at their farm, which have won many prominent races. One of his most famous horses was Cynisca, which won three consecutive Wellington Cups. Like his father, Hunter was prominent in the administration of horse racing, and he submitted the Gaming Amendment Bill to Parliament. The brothers' partnership ended in 1908, with both taking half the land, George Hunter keeping the portion with the homestead.

Political career

Hunter was a member of Patangata County for over 30 years.

Philanthropy
After World War I, Hunter gave land valued at NZ£30,000 for the settlement of returned soldiers.

Family and death
On 23 February 1922, Hunter married for the first time. In a small circle of family and close friends, he married Edith May Munro (née Ford). They had a daughter, Elizabeth Hunter, on 1 May 1923.

Hunter was appointed a Knight Bachelor in the 1921 New Year Honours, the citation reading:

Has rendered valuable assistance in connection with the settlement of returned soldiers.

He fell ill during the first session of the 23rd Parliament in 1929, and was in indifferent health thereafter. He returned to Wellington for the second session in 1930 and died in Wellington on 20 August 1930, survived by his wife and one daughter. The funeral service was held at St Peter's Church in Wellington. The body was then taken by train to Waipukurau. His daughter died in 1999.

Notes

References

1859 births
1930 deaths
New Zealand Knights Bachelor
Reform Party (New Zealand) MPs
New Zealand people of Scottish descent
Unsuccessful candidates in the 1890 New Zealand general election
Unsuccessful candidates in the 1893 New Zealand general election
Unsuccessful candidates in the 1899 New Zealand general election
Unsuccessful candidates in the 1905 New Zealand general election
Unsuccessful candidates in the 1908 New Zealand general election
Members of the New Zealand House of Representatives
New Zealand MPs for North Island electorates
People from Wellington City
19th-century New Zealand politicians
New Zealand politicians awarded knighthoods